Limache is a Chilean town and township in the Marga Marga Province, Valparaíso Region. Limache is the only township of Chile that has two urban areas: San Francisco de Limache on the north side of the Pelumpén stream, and Limache Viejo on the south side. Limache is famous for its tomato production and the religious feast of "The Virgin of the 40 Hours".

Geography

Culture
The Feast of the Virgin of the 40 Hours (La Fiesta de la Virgen de las 40 Horas) begins in Limache 40 hours before the last Sunday in February with masses every hour, culminating on Sunday with a procession through the city.

Demographics
According to the 2002 census of the National Statistics Institute Limache has 39,219 inhabitants (19,269 men and 19,950 women). Of these, 34,948 (89.1%) lived in urban areas and 4,271 (10.9%) in rural areas. The population grew by 12.6% (4,380 persons) between the 1992 and 2002 censuses.

Administration
As a township, Limache is a third-level administrative division of Chile administered by a municipal council, headed by a mayor who is directly elected every four years. The present mayor is Daniel Morales Espíndola (Independent, pro-RN).

Within the electoral divisions of Chile, Limache is represented in the Chamber of Deputies by Marcelo Schilling (PS) and Arturo Squella (UDI) as part of the 12th electoral district, (together with Olmué, Villa Alemana, Quilpué). The township is represented in the Senate by Ignacio Walker Prieto (PDC) and Lily Pérez San Martín (RN) as part of the 5th senatorial constituency (Valparaíso-Cordillera).

References

Communes of Chile
Populated places in Marga Marga Province